Helen Douglas Smith (July 10, 1886 – July 3, 1955) was a Canadian politician. She served in the Legislative Assembly of British Columbia from 1933 to 1941,  from the electoral district of Vancouver-Burrard, a member of the Liberal party.

References

1886 births
1955 deaths
Women MLAs in British Columbia
British Columbia Liberal Party MLAs